Aldersladum is a genus of the Alcyoniidae family. Aldersladum are Alcyonacea found from the Philippine Sea to the Indian Ocean. The genus was created from previously descried corals with similar properties in 2011.

Species
Aldersladum jengi Benayahu & McFadden, 2011
Aldersladum nana Hickson, 1931
Aldersladum sodwanum Benayahu, 1993

References

External links

Alcyoniidae
Octocorallia genera